Kacper Gomólski (born 2 March 1993 in Gniezno, Poland) is a Polish motorcycle speedway rider.

Career
Gomólski, the younger brother of fellow Speedway rider Adrian Gomólski and son of Jacek Gomólski began his Polish Speedway career in 2008, racing for hometown club Start Gniezno who he rode for until 2011. Before moving to Unia Tarnów and his now current club Unibax Toruń.

He was given his first opportunity in British Speedway by the Peterborough Panthers, before moving to the Swindon Robins at the age of just 19. He endured a tough season at Swindon and he found himself without a club in the Britain for the 2014 season. In 2015 Gomólski was back in British Speedway, this time with reigning Elite League champions the Poole Pirates. Poole promoter Matt Ford defended the decision to sign Gomólski, insisting that he would prove to be "an absolute steal" and that he is a "dramatically different" rider now to the one that most British Speedway fans would remember from the Swindon Robins.

In 2022, he helped PSŻ Poznań win the 2022 2.Liga.

References

Polish speedway riders
1993 births
Living people
Peterborough Panthers riders
Swindon Robins riders
Poole Pirates riders
People from Gniezno
Sportspeople from Greater Poland Voivodeship